The Berkeley Lower Extremity Exoskeleton (BLEEX) is a robotic device that attaches to the lower body. Its purpose is to complement the user's strength by adding extra force to the user's lower extremity bodily movements. The BLEEX was funded by the Defense Advanced Research Projects Agency (DARPA), and developed by the Berkeley Robotics and Human Engineering Laboratory, a unit within the University of California, Berkeley Department of Mechanical Engineering.  DARPA provided the initial $50 million of start-up funds in 2001.

Design 
The BLEEX has four hydraulically actuated joints: two at the hip, one at the knee, and one at the ankle. The BLEEX is energetically autonomous, meaning it has an on-board power supply.

Development later moved to Lockheed Martin, where the device became known as the Human Universal Load Carrier, or HULC.

Performance 
The BLEEX consumes 1143 watts of hydraulic power during ground-level walking along with another 200 watts of electrical power for electronics.

References 

Robots of the United States
Robotic exoskeletons
2003 robots
University of California, Berkeley